Emma Ruíz (26 January 1922 – 9 December 2014) was a Mexican fencer. She competed in the women's individual foil event at the 1948 Summer Olympics.

References

External links
 

1922 births
2014 deaths
Mexican female foil fencers
Olympic fencers of Mexico
Fencers at the 1948 Summer Olympics
People from Oaxaca